Health care efficiency measures compare delivery system outputs, such as physician visits, RVU's, or health outcomes, with inputs like cost, time, or material.  Efficiency can be reported then as a ratio of outputs to inputs or a comparison to optimal productivity using stochastic frontier analysis or data envelopment analysis.

One difficulty in creating a generalized efficiency measure is comparability of outputs.  For example, if hospital A discharges 100 people at an average cost of $8000, while hospital B discharges 100 at $7000, the presumption may be that B is more efficient, but hospital B may be discharging patients with poorer health that will require readmission and net higher costs to treat.

Outputs

Commercial efficiency measure outputs can be put into two broad categories:  episodes of care, or population based care.

References

Health care management